L'Arbresle is a commune of the Rhône department, eastern France.  Composer Claude Terrasse and inventor Barthélemy Thimonnier were born in L'Arbresle.

Population

See also
 Communes of the Rhône department

References

External links 

 Official Web site

Communes of Rhône (department)
Lyonnais